The military history of England and Wales deals with the period prior to the creation of the United Kingdom of Great Britain in 1707.(for the period after 1707 see Military history of the United Kingdom)

List of military encounters

Medieval period
 Battle of Aylesford (455)
 Battle of Badon (c. 500)
 Battle of Ellandun (825)
 Viking invasions (793–1066)
  Battle of Hingston Down (838)
Battle of Aclea (851)
 Battle of York (867)
 Battle of Englefield 870
 Battle of Reading (871)
 Battle of Ashdown (871)
 Battle of Basing (871)
 Battle of Meretun (871)
 Campaign of Alfred the Great (871–899)
 Battle of Edington (878)
 Battle of Cynwit (878)
 Battle of Assandun (1016)
 Battle of Fulford (1066)
 Battle of Stamford Bridge (1066)
 Norman conquest of England (1066)
 Battle of Hastings (1066)
 Rebellion of 1088
 The Anarchy (1138–53)
 Revolt of 1173–74
 Third Crusade (1189–1192)
 French invasion of Normandy (1202–1204)
 Welsh uprising of 1211
 Anglo-French War (1213–1214)
 First Barons' War (1215–1217)
 Saintonge War (1242–43)
 Second Barons' War (1264–1267)
 Welsh Uprising (1282)
 Anglo-French War (1294–1303)
 The First War of Scottish Independence (1296–1328)
 Battle of Bannockburn (1314)
 The Second War of Scottish Independence (1332–1357)
 Hundred Years' War (1337–1453)
 Edwardian phase (1337–60)
 War of the Breton Succession (1341–65)
 Caroline phase (1369–89)
 Lancastrian phase (1415–53)
 Wars of the Roses (1455–1485) – The Wars of the Roses claimed an estimated 105,000 dead

Early Modern period
 Italian Wars (1494–1559)
 War of the League of Cambrai (1511–13)
 Italian War of 1521–26
 Italian War of 1542–46
 Italian War of 1551–59 (1557–59)
 Cornish Rebellion (1497) 
 Anglo-Scottish Wars (1513; 1544–51)
 Third Cornish Uprising (1549)
 Siege of Calais (1558)
 Desmond Wars (1569-83)
 Anglo-Spanish War (1585–1604)  – The Anglo-Spanish War might be said to be the first world war, in that it was fought on three continents (Europe and the Americas) and two oceans (the Atlantic and, just barely, the Pacific)
 Nine Years' War (Ireland) (1594–1603)
 Eighty Years' War (1585–1648)
 First Anglo-Powhatan War (1609–1613)
 Second Anglo-Powhatan War (1622)
 Anglo-Spanish War (1625–30)
 Anglo-French War (1627–1629)
 Wars of the Three Kingdoms (1639–1651)
 First Bishops' War (1639)
 Second Bishops' War (1640)
 Irish Rebellion (1641)
 The Confederates' War  (1642-648)
 English Civil War (1642–1651)
 First English Civil War (1642–1646) – 190,000 Englishmen died
 Civil War in Scotland (1644–1647)
 Second English Civil War (1648)
 Cromwellian conquest of Ireland (1649–53) – Cromwell killed 300,000 to 500,000 Irish in his invasion
 Third English Civil War (1650–1651)
 Third Anglo-Powhatan War (1644)
 First Anglo-Dutch War (1652–54)
 Anglo-Spanish War (1654–60)
 English expedition to Portugal (1662–1668)
 Second Anglo-Dutch War (1665–67)
 War of Devolution (1667–1668)
 Third Anglo-Dutch War (1672–1674)
 King Philip's War (1675–1676)
 Virginia Rebellion (1676)
 Monmouth Rebellion (1685)
 Nine Years' War (1688–1697)
King William's War (1688–1697)
 Jacobite Rebellions (1689–91)
 Williamite War in Ireland (1688–1691)
 Battle of the Boyne (1690)
 War of the Spanish Succession (1702–1713)
 Queen Anne's War (1702–1713)
For military history after the Acts of Union 1707 see the military history of the United Kingdom

List of civil wars
 Rebellion of 1088 – in England and Normandy
 The Anarchy (1135–54) – in England
 Revolt of 1173–74 – in England, Normandy, and Anjou
 First Barons' War (1215–17) – in England
 Second Barons' War (1264–67) – in England
 Welsh Uprising (1282) – in England and Wales
 Despenser War (1321-22)
 Wars of the Roses (1455–85) – in England and Wales; Richard III was the last English king to die in combat
 Wars of the Three Kingdoms (1639–51) - in England, Wales, Scotland and Ireland
 First Bishops' War (1639)
 Second Bishops' War (1640)
 Irish Rebellion of 1641
 First English Civil War (1642–1646)
 The Confederates' War  (1642-48)
 Scotland in the Wars of the Three Kingdoms (1644–47)
 Second English Civil War (1648)
 Third English Civil War (1650–51)
 Cromwellian conquest of Ireland (1649)
 Monmouth Rebellion (1685) – in England
 Jacobite Rebellions (1689-91; 1715-16; 1719; 1745-46) – in England, Scotland and Ireland
 Williamite War in Ireland (1688–91)
 Battle of the Boyne (1690) – last battle between two rival claimants for the throne

See also
List of wars involving England
List of wars involving England and France
List of wars involving Great Britain
List of wars in Great Britain

References

Further reading
 Barnett, Correlli. Britain and her army, 1509-1970: a military, political and social survey (1970).
 Carlton, Charles. This Seat of Mars: War and the British Isles, 1485-1746 (Yale UP; 2011) 332 pages; studies the impact of near unceasing war from the individual to the national levels.
 Chandler, David G., and Ian Frederick William Beckett, eds. The Oxford history of the British army (Oxford UP, 2003).
 Cole, D. H and E. C Priestley. An outline of British military history, 1660-1936 (1936). online
 Higham, John, ed. A Guide to the Sources of British Military History  (1971) 654 pages excerpt; Highly detailed bibliography and discussion up to 1970.
 James, Lawrence. Warrior race: a history of the British at war (Hachette UK, 2010). excerpt
 Ranft, Bryan. The Oxford Illustrated History of the Royal Navy (Oxford UP, 2002).
 Rodger, N. A.M. The safeguard of the sea: A naval history of Britain, 660-1649 (Vol. 1. 1998). excerpt
 Rodger, N.A.M.The Command of the Ocean: A Naval History of Britain, 1649-1815 (vol 2 2006) excerpt
 Schroeder, Paul W. "Old Wine in Old Bottles: Recent Contributions to British Foreign Policy and European International Politics, 1789–1848." Journal of British Studies 26.01 (1987): 1-25.
 Sheppard, Eric William. A short history of the British army (1950). online
 Ward, A.W. and G.P. Gooch, eds. The Cambridge History of British Foreign Policy, 1783-1919 (3 vol, 1921–23), old detailed classic; vol 1, 1783-1815 ;  vol 2, 1815-1866; vol 3. 1866-1919  
 Wiener, Martin J. "The Idea of "Colonial Legacy" and the Historiography of Empire." Journal of The Historical Society 13#1 (2013): 1-32.
 Winks, Robin, ed. Historiography (1999) vol. 5 in William Roger Louis, eds. The Oxford History of the British Empire online
 Winks, Robin W. The Historiography of the British Empire-Commonwealth: Trends, Interpretations and Resources (1966); this book is by a different set of authors from the previous 1999 entry  online

Historiography
 Messenger, Charles, ed. Reader's Guide to Military History (2001) pp 55-74 etc; annotated guide to most important books.

 
Wars involving England
English history-related lists
United Kingdom military-related lists